Alvin Lee (born Graham Anthony Barnes; 19 December 1944 – 6 March 2013) was an English singer, songwriter, and guitarist. He is best known as the lead vocalist and lead guitarist of the blues rock band Ten Years After.

Early life
Lee was born in Nottingham and attended the Margaret Glen-Bott School in Wollaton. He began playing guitar at the age of 13. In 1960, Lee, along with bassist Leo Lyons, formed the core of the band Ten Years After. He was influenced by his parents' collection of jazz and blues records, but it was the advent of rock and roll that sparked his interest.

Career
Lee's performance at the Woodstock Festival was captured on film in the documentary of the event, and his 'lightning-fast' playing helped catapult him to stardom. The film brought Lee's music to a worldwide audience, although he later lamented that he missed the lost freedom and spiritual dedication of earlier audiences.

Lee was named "the Fastest guitarist in the West", and considered a precursor to shred-style playing that would develop in the 1980s.

Ten Years After had success, releasing ten albums together, but by 1973, Lee was feeling limited by the band's style. Moving to Columbia Records had resulted in a radio hit song, "I'd Love to Change the World", but Lee preferred blues-rock to the pop to which the label steered them. He left the group after their second Columbia LP. With American Christian rock pioneer Mylon LeFevre, along with guests George Harrison, Steve Winwood, Ronnie Wood and Mick Fleetwood, he recorded and released On the Road to Freedom, an acclaimed album that was at the forefront of country rock. Also in 1973, he sat in on the Jerry Lee Lewis double album The Session...Recorded in London with Great Artists recorded in London, featuring many other guest stars including Albert Lee, Peter Frampton and Rory Gallagher. A year later, in response to a dare, Lee formed Alvin Lee & Company to play a show at the Rainbow Theatre in London and released it as a double live album, In Flight. Various members of the band continued on with Lee for his next two albums, Pump Iron! and Let It Rock. In late 1975, he played guitar for a couple of tracks on Bo Diddley's The 20th Anniversary of Rock 'n' Roll all-star album. He finished the 1970s with an outfit called Ten Years Later, with Tom Compton on drums and Mick Hawksworth on bass, which released two albums, Rocket Fuel (1978) and Ride On (1979), and toured extensively throughout Europe and the United States.

The 1980s brought another change in Lee's direction, with two albums that were collaborations with Rare Bird's Steve Gould, and a tour for which the former John Mayall and Rolling Stones guitarist Mick Taylor joined his band.

Lee's overall musical output includes more than twenty albums, including 1987's Detroit Diesel, 1989's About Time (the reunion album he did with Ten Years After) recorded in Memphis with producer Terry Manning, and the back to back 1990s collections of Zoom and Nineteen Ninety-Four (US title I Hear You Rockin'''). Guest artists on both albums included George Harrison.In Tennessee, recorded with Scotty Moore and D. J. Fontana, was released in 2004. Lee's last album, Still on the Road to Freedom, was released in September 2012.

Death
Lee died on 6 March 2013 in Spain. He died from "unforeseen complications following a routine surgical procedure" to correct an atrial arrhythmia. He was 68. His former bandmates lamented his death. Leo Lyons called him "the closest thing I had to a brother", while Ric Lee (no relation) said "I don't think it's even sunk in yet as to the reality of his passing". Billboard'' highlighted such landmark performances as "I'm Going Home" from the Woodstock festival and his 1971 hit single "I'd Love to Change the World".

Discography

Studio albums 

 NOTE: "Ride On" actually contains one studio side and one live side.

Collaborative album

Live albums

Singles

References

External links 

 
 
 ALVIN LEE & TEN YEARS AFTER
 

1944 births
2013 deaths
20th-century English singers
21st-century English singers
English rock singers
English blues singers
English rock guitarists
English blues guitarists
English male guitarists
English record producers
English male singer-songwriters
English rock musicians
British rockabilly musicians
Blues singer-songwriters
Electric blues musicians
Blues rock musicians
British blues (genre) musicians
British rhythm and blues boom musicians
Lead guitarists
Sitar players
People from Nottingham
Musicians from Nottinghamshire
Ten Years After members
Decca Records artists
Deram Records artists
Columbia Records artists
Chrysalis Records artists
Polydor Records artists
RSO Records artists
Atlantic Records artists
20th-century British guitarists
21st-century British guitarists
20th-century British male singers
21st-century British male singers
20th-century British businesspeople
Bellaphon Records artists